Maruthi Mandir,Mushampally Road, Nalgonda. Maruthi Mandir is a Hindu temple in the town of Nalgonda. The primary deity god of the temple is Hanuman

Hindu temples in Nalgonda district